Mickaël Buzaré (born June 30, 1976 in Lesneven) is a French former professional footballer defender. He played most of his career with Ligue 2 side Stade Laval.

External links
 
 

Living people
1976 births
Sportspeople from Finistère
Association football defenders
French footballers
Stade Brestois 29 players
Stade Rennais F.C. players
Stade Lavallois players
Footballers from Brittany
Brittany international footballers